Brandon Christopher Jacobs (born July 6, 1982) is a former American football running back, who spent the majority of his career with the New York Giants of the National Football League (NFL). He played college football at Coffeyville, Auburn, and Southern Illinois. He was drafted by the Giants in the fourth round of the 2005 NFL Draft, and won two Super Bowl rings with the team, both against the New England Patriots. He also played one season for the San Francisco 49ers before returning to New York for his final season.

He also ran the 100 meters in 10.82 seconds and the 200 meters in 21.59 seconds. He won two Super Bowls in seven seasons with the New York Giants, and holds the franchise record for most career rushing touchdowns, as well as ranking fourth-most in career rushing yards.

Early life
Brandon Jacobs grew up in Napoleonville, Louisiana. He was raised by his mother and her sisters. His aunt and uncle later became his legal guardians. He never had a relationship with his father. Brandon played basketball and football at Assumption High School. In his senior year, he received accolades such as USA Today All-America, Orlando Sentinel All-Southern, Prep Star All-Region and Louisiana Class 4A Most Valuable Offensive Player. He ran for more than 3,000 yards and scored 38 touchdowns in that senior campaign.

College career

Coffeyville Community College
Jacobs's college career started at Coffeyville Community College in Coffeyville, Kansas, under the direction of head coach Jeff Leiker and running backs coach Dickie Rolls. Coffeyville is a member school of the Kansas Jayhawk Community College Conference. In 2001, his freshman year at Coffeyville, he ran for 1,349 yards and 17 touchdowns and gained Kansas Jayhawk Conference All-Conference honorable mention. He was also named the team MVP for CCC. In his sophomore season for the Red Ravens he racked up 1,896 yards and 20 touchdowns on 267 carries for a 7.1 yard-per-carry average. In light of these efforts Jacobs was named a JUCO All-American and to the KJCCC All-Conference First-team. He once again garnered the Team MVP trophy and was also named the recipient of the Reb Russell Memorial Football Scholarship Award. The statistic of 1,896 yards rushing ranks second all-time on the Ravens individual season rushing yardage record.

Auburn
Jacobs continued his college career at Auburn University, along with first-round draft picks Carnell Williams, Ronnie Brown, and Jason Campbell. Jacobs was the third-string running back behind Williams and Brown. Jacobs gained 446 yards on 72 carries and 2 touchdowns in 2003 for the Tigers.

Southern Illinois
After the completion of the 2003 college football season, Jacobs transferred to then Division I-AA Southern Illinois. Jacobs' one year at Southern Illinois was another solid one. He led the team with 150 carries for 992 yards (6.6 avg) and 19 touchdowns, one less than the school's all-time leader, Muhammad Abdulqaadir, who, like Jacobs, also played at Coffeyville Community College. Jacobs was an All-American first-team selection by The NFL Draft Report and All-Gateway Conference first-team choice and was also named Gateway Conference Newcomer of the Year. He led the conference and ranked tenth in the nation in scoring, averaging 9.5 points per game. Jacobs had eight receptions for 83 yards (10.4 avg), returned six kickoffs for 140 yards (23.3 avg) and had five 100-yard rushing games including the playoffs.

Professional career

2005 NFL Draft
Jacobs was graded the 11th best running back available in the 2005 NFL Draft by Sports Illustrated. He was projected an early fourth round pick, and was indeed selected early in the fourth round (110th overall).

New York Giants

Going into the 2006 season, Jacobs stated that he studied film of famed power running back Eddie George in an effort to refine his running style. George, like Jacobs, was a large, powerful running back. In the 2006 season, Jacobs carried the ball 96 times for 423 yards and nine touchdowns, averaging 4.4 yards per carry.  He added 11 receptions for 149 yards.

With the retirement of Tiki Barber, Jacobs took over the starting running back spot for the Giants in the 2007 season.  He injured his knee in the first game of the season against the Dallas Cowboys, but returned four weeks later against the New York Jets to rush for 100 yards and a touchdown.  Jacobs would miss two more games later in the season with a hamstring injury, but finish the regular season with rushing totals of 1,009 yards and four touchdowns on 201 carries.  He also added 23 receptions for 174 yards and two touchdowns. Jacobs scored the winning touchdown against the Dallas Cowboys in the NFC Divisional Playoffs. Jacobs started every game in the playoffs as the Giants won Super Bowl XLII.

Jacobs underwent wrist surgery during the 2008 offseason.  He returned to play all of the preseason, but missed two games in the regular season due to recurring difficulty with his knee.  He finished the 2008 regular season with 219 carries for 1089 yards and 15 touchdowns, similar yardage to 2007, but many more touchdowns.  In 2008, he and Derrick Ward became the fifth pair of teammates to rush for 1,000 yards in a single season.

He was the "Earth" in the running back corps of the Giants nicknamed "Earth, Wind, & Fire" with Derrick Ward (Wind) and Ahmad Bradshaw (Fire). He is also nicknamed Juggernaut because of his ability to break multiple tackles and the difficulty in bringing him down due to his impressive size for a running back.  Similarly, he has been dubbed "The Creator" by the satirical sports website Ramon Hernandez Put Down The Gun, and is considered complementary to Justin Tuck, who is known as "The Destroyer."

On February 13, 2009 the Giants placed the Franchise Tag on Jacobs. He signed a four-year, $25 million contract with the Giants a week later and had most of the carries that season.

On December 31, 2009, Jacobs was placed on injured reserve due to a knee injury.

On September 19, 2010, Jacobs threw his helmet into the stands at Lucas Oil Stadium and was fined $10,000.

On November 24, 2010, Jacobs was announced back as the number one running back for the Giants against the Jacksonville Jaguars.

At the end of the 2011 season, Jacobs and the Giants appeared in Super Bowl XLVI. He had 9 carries for 37 yards as the Giants defeated the New England Patriots by a score of 21–17.

The Giants released Jacobs on March 9, 2012.

San Francisco 49ers
Jacobs signed with the San Francisco 49ers on March 28, 2012. He missed the first two months of the season after suffering a knee injury during training camp, and saw limited playing time once he returned. He was active for two games and had five carries for seven yards as essentially the third- or fourth-string tailback.

The 49ers suspended him for the final three games of the same season following a series of posts by Jacobs on social media sites addressing his lack of playing time, including one which said he was "on this team rotting away." Jacobs was waived by the 49ers on December 31, 2012.

New York Giants (second stint)
Jacobs signed a one-year contract with the New York Giants on September 10, 2013. In which he played in 7 games, rushing for 238 yards on 58 carries for a 4.1 yard average and 4 touchdowns. On January 2, 2014, Jacobs announced his retirement after nine seasons.

On May 27, 2021, Jacobs announced on Twitter that he would be attempting a return to the NFL as a defensive end, stating “Just give me one chance thats all!!”.

NFL career statistics
Source:

Regular season

Postseason

Personal life
In June 2011, Jacobs acted in the series finale episode of Law & Order: Criminal Intent. On October 19, 2012, Jacobs appeared, with Pro NRG founder Tania Patruno, to pitch the fledgling company's protein supplement/energy drink and hopefully score the venture some investment capital on episode #406 of ABC's Shark Tank. Jacobs also appeared on an episode of Impact Wrestling which aired on February 16, 2012. Jacobs put wrestler Bully Ray through a table on the episode.

Jacobs resides in Georgia.

References

External links

 New York Giants bio
 Southern Illinois University Salukis bio
 
 San Francisco 49ers Player Bio
 TSN.ca NFL Player Bio
 ESPN Player Bio
 

1982 births
African-American players of American football
American football running backs
Auburn Tigers football players
Coffeyville Red Ravens football players
Living people
New York Giants players
People from Wayne, New Jersey
Sportspeople from Houma, Louisiana
Players of American football from Louisiana
San Francisco 49ers players
Southern Illinois Salukis football players
People from Napoleonville, Louisiana
21st-century African-American sportspeople
20th-century African-American people